Anopheles pallidus is a species complex of mosquito belonging to the genus Anopheles. It is found in India, and Sri Lanka and Myanmar. It is a potential natural vector of bancroftian filariasis in Sri Lanka as well as Malaria and Babesiosis in other countries.

References

External links
Malaria risk mapping in Sri Lanka - Results from the Uda Walawe area
Species composition and population dynamics of malaria vectors in three previously ignored aquatic systems in Sri Lanka
On the Importance of Anopheles pallidus as a Carrier of Malaria in Udaipur State, Central Provinces.

pallidus
Insects described in 1901